The Quirinópolis Microregion is a region in south Goiás state, Brazil.  It includes 8 municipalities with a population of 95,094 (2007) and  a total area of 16,117.60 km2.

Municipalities gaining population since 1980:  Caçu, Paranaiguara, Quirinópolis, São Simão.
Municipalities losing population since 1980:  Cachoeira Alta, Itajá, Itarumã.
Municipalities formed after 1980:  Gouvelândia and Lagoa Santa.

Municipalities 
The microregion consists of the following municipalities:

Economics

Health and education

See also
Microregions of Goiás
List of municipalities in Goiás

References

Microregions of Goiás